Mignonne or Mignonnes may refer to:


Ships
 French frigate Mignonne (1767)
 French corvette Mignonne (1795)
 , three French ships, all captured by the Royal Navy

People
 Mignonne Fernando, Sri Lankan singer, part of the group The Jetliners
 Mignonne Meekels (born 1986), Dutch field hockey player

Music
 Mignonne, a 1978 album by Taeko Onuki
 Mignonne, an 1839 Lied by Richard Wagner
 "À Mignonne", a melody composed by Jules Massenet
 "Mignonne", an 1894 song by Cécile Chaminade

Films
 Mignonnes (English: Cuties), a 2020 French coming-of-age drama film

See also 
 Suite mignonne, a 1921 composition by Jean Sibelius
 Mignon (disambiguation)

Feminine given names